Horst is a village in the Dutch province of Limburg. It is located in the municipality of Horst aan de Maas. Although the municipality is named after the village, Horst itself is not called "aan de Maas", because it does not lie directly on the river Meuse (in Dutch called Maas).

Horst is known for its holiday parks. It is a popular destination for people looking for walks and cycling in nature. The village centre has plenty of cafes and restaurants and during summer season markets and other events are held regularly.

Towns and the number of inhabitants on 1 January 2016
America, 2.055
Broekhuizen, 763
Broekhuizenvorst, 1077
Eversoort, 256
Griendtsveen, 541
Grubbenvorst, 4.799
Hegelsom, 1.908
Horst, 12.780
Kronenberg, 1.152
Lottum, 1.948
Meerlo, 1.892
Melderslo, 2.053
Meterik, 1.471
Sevenum, 6.546
Swolgen, 1.230
Tienray, 1.208
Total, 41.679
(Updated from the 2016 Horst aan de Maas official website infographics data)

Horst was a separate municipality until it merged with Broekhuizen and Grubbenvorst to form the new municipality Horst aan de Maas in 2007. Later the municipality had the villages of; Grubbenvorst, Lottum, Broekhuizen and Broekhuizenvorst added to it.

Transportation
Railway station: Horst-Sevenum

This can be reached by buses 60 and 69 

Horst is adjacent to the A73 motorway which runs north-south. A few kilometres away the A73 intersects with the A67, which runs east-west.

Germany is about 15 kilometres east of Horst. Airport Weeze is about 40 minutes by car.

References

Municipalities of the Netherlands disestablished in 2001
Populated places in Limburg (Netherlands)
Former municipalities of Limburg (Netherlands)
Horst aan de Maas